Robinson 2022 was the twenty-second season of the Swedish reality television series and the second season of 2022. This season was also the first (and last) to have Petra Malm as  presenter. The season premiered on 9 October 2022 on TV4 and ended on 18 December 2022. Lars-Olov Johansson won and thus earned 500.000 SEK.

References

External links

Expedition Robinson Sweden seasons
2022 Swedish television seasons
TV4 (Sweden) original programming